Gibson Dam is a concrete arch dam on the Sun River, a tributary of the Missouri River, about  west of Great Falls, Montana in the United States.

Specifications

Water released from Gibson travels downstream for about  before it is intercepted by the Sun River Diversion Dam, which diverts water into the Pishkun Supply Canal, which sends water to the offstream Pishkun Reservoir. The Sun River Slope Canal System takes water from Pishkin Reservoir to serve the irrigated lands on the north side of the river. The headworks for the Fort Shaw Canal, which serves the lands south of the river, are located further downstream and take water directly from the river. The lands north of the river comprise the Greenfields Irrigation District, while the south side is run by the Fort Shaw Irrigation District.

History
On September 26, 1906, the Department of the Interior authorized the USBR's Sun River Project, under pressure from local residents, namely those of Great Falls, who wanted the irrigation of lands east of the Rocky Mountains along the Sun and Teton Rivers. Early proposals included the diversion of streams from west of the Continental Divide to augment the arid region's water supply, but eventually the project was pared down to comprise two storage dams on the Sun River and a tributary, Willow Creek; two off-stream reservoirs and a diversion dam; and seven main canals.

As early as 1889, the Gibson Dam site – located in a narrow mountain gap a few miles above the mouth of the Sun River canyon – had been identified by U.S. surveyor Herbert Wilson as an excellent location to develop water storage on the Sun River. More detailed studies in 1911 by the USBR (then the U.S. Reclamation Service) confirmed Wilson's idea, and the first plans for a dam were drafted around 1920. However, it was not until September 1926 when the $1.5 million main construction contract was given to Utah Construction Company. The dam was one of the first to be built using the trial-load method, which relies primarily on mathematical calculations to determine the pressure of water on the structure, and thus the dam's final design. This method allowed the USBR to save an estimated  of concrete, lowering costs significantly, since otherwise a considerable safety margin would have had to be built into the dam.

Actual construction started in December 1926, with Albert E. Paddock as project superintendent and Ralph Lowry as construction engineer. Preliminary excavations and site clearing were followed by the placement of a wooden flume to divert the river before concrete pouring in the foundation work could begin. When the foundations were complete, the flume was closed and water allowed to pass through outlet holes in the base of the dam.

However, after determining that the future reservoir would not have enough capacity to sustain power production, USBR sealed the penstocks and the power lines fell into disuse. The dam was completed and the first water stored in December 1929 after three years of construction. 

In 1938, gates were installed in the spillway, increasing the reservoir's storage capacity by 20 percent. 

At least three people were killed on the project, including Paddock and an unknown workman; the latter fell from a  height and struck the former on April 20, 1929. In the early phases of construction in 1926, a laborer, M. G. Miller, died from injuries sustained from a dynamite explosion.

Flood control
By halting the Sun River's spring freshet, Gibson Dam has prevented an estimated $3,044,000 in flooding damage between 1950 and 1999.

In 1964, western Montana experienced one of the greatest flooding events in its recorded history, when record snowpack followed by heavy early spring rains caused more than $438 million (2011 dollars) of damage in the Flathead and Missouri River basins. On June 8, after reports of at least three dam failures on tributaries of the Missouri sent local residents into a panic, there were rumors that the Gibson Dam had failed.

Hydroelectric power proposal
The Gibson Dam Hydroelectric Company "Gibson Hydro" is a two-member partnership proposing a renewable energy facility on the Gibson Dam. Tollhouse Energy of Bellingham, WA a small-business hydropower developer and Greenfields Irrigation District of Fairfield, MT a farmer-managed water utility, are proposing the addition of a 15 megawatt (MW) powerhouse at the base of the dam. The powerhouse would generate electricity from irrigation water releases with an estimated annual production of 42.9 million kilowatt hours.

See also
List of dams and reservoirs in Montana

References

External links
Gibson Reservoir live water levels

Buildings and structures in Lewis and Clark County, Montana
Buildings and structures in Teton County, Montana
Dams in Montana
United States Bureau of Reclamation dams
Arch dams
Dams completed in 1929